Rhonda Mapp (born October 13, 1969) is a former professional basketball player. She played 13 professional seasons, including time in Spain, Italy, France, Turkey, Israel, and Korea.

Expanded description 

Rhonda Mapp was hired as the coach at Queen's Grant High School in Matthews, North Carolina. Queen's Grant is a charter school for students in the Charlotte-Mecklenburg County area and has an enrollment of about 500. Mapp led Asheville to a state-championship in 1987 and has her jersey (No. 51) retired at the school. She still holds the school record for rebounds in a season (514) and career (1,032).

College career 
A dominant low-post player, Rhonda Mapp was named to the first-team 
All-ACC squad in 1991 and 1992. Mapp helped lead the Wolfpack to a 
three-year record of 67-25 as well as NCAA Tournament
appearances in 1989 and 1991. In 1991, she helped lead the Wolfpack to win the ACC Championship and was named to the first-team All-tournament team and shot 57.6 percent for the season State finished with a No. 7 final national ranking by the Associated Press and 10th by USA Today. In
her final season in 1992, Mapp led the ACC in scoring (22.0) and rebounding (9.8) and finished her collegiate career with 1,553 points, which still ranks 10th on the Wolfpack career scoring list. She also ranks 5th at NC State in career scoring average (17.6), 9th in career field goals made (625), 4th in career field goal percentage (.578), 9th in rebounds (810) and 6th in career double-doubles (37). Played five seasons professionally in the WNBA with the Charlotte Sting (1997–99) 
and Los Angeles Sparks (2001, 2003).

NC State statistics
Source

WNBA
Mapp was the third pick in the 1997 WNBA Elite Draft selected by the Charlotte Sting. After four seasons in Charlotte, Mapp was traded to the Los Angeles Sparks along with E.C. Hill, in exchange for Allison Feaster and Clarisse Machanguana. Mapp averaged 10.8 points and 5.9 rebounds per game while playing in 109 of 122 games with the Sting. She helped the Sparks win the 2001 WNBA Championship, then missed the 2002 season, when they repeated as champions, because on unspecified personal reasons. In 2003, Mapp became the first player to be dismissed for violation of the league's anti-drug program.

As a member of the Sting, she was a consistent scorer, her lowest point per game average in her four years at Charlotte being 9.5 ppg.

WNBA stats - per game averages

Regular season

|-
| style="text-align:left;"|1997
| style="text-align:left;"|Charlotte
| 28 || 23 || 25.4 || .492 || .500 || .774 || 5.5 || 2.3 || 0.8 || 0.4 || 2.4 || 11.6
|-
| style="text-align:left;"|1998
| style="text-align:left;"|Charlotte
| 21 || 14 || 21.7 || .506 || .100 || .750 || 4.2 || 1.6 || 0.6 || 0.4 || 1.9 || 10.1
|-
| style="text-align:left;"|1999
| style="text-align:left;"|Charlotte
| 30 || 26 || 26.3 || .500 || .111 || .721 || 6.4 || 1.9 || 0.8 || 0.4 || 2.0 || 9.5
|-
| style="text-align:left;"|2000
| style="text-align:left;"|Charlotte
| 30 || 30 || 28.5 || .460 || .364 || .830 || 6.8 || 2.1 || 1.0 || 0.8 || 2.0 || 11.9
|-
| style="text-align:left;background:#afe6ba;"|2001†
| style="text-align:left;"|Los Angeles
| 30 || 0 || 13.2 || .415 || .000 || .750 || 2.6 || 0.5 || 0.5 || 0.2 || 0.8 || 4.2
|-
| style="text-align:left;"|2003
| style="text-align:left;"|Los Angeles
| 24 || 4 || 10.6 || .500 || .000 || .500 || 2.8 || 0.3 || 0.3 || 0.3 || 0.5 || 2.6
|-
| style="text-align:left;"|Career
| style="text-align:left;"|6 years, 2 teams
| 163 || 97 || 21.2 || .479 || .264 || .768 || 4.8 || 1.5 || 0.7 || 0.4 || 1.6 || 8.4

Playoffs

|-
| style="text-align:left;"|1997
| style="text-align:left;"|Charlotte
| 1 || 1 || 36.0 || .333 || — || 1.000 || 7.0 || 3.0 || 1.0 || 0.0 || 2.0 || 12.0
|-
| style="text-align:left;"|1998
| style="text-align:left;"|Charlotte
| 2 || 2 || 32.5 || .571 || .000 || 1.000 || 7.0 || 1.0 || 0.0 || 0.5 || 1.0 || 13.5
|-
| style="text-align:left;"|1999
| style="text-align:left;"|Charlotte
| 4 || 4 || 30.3 || .531 || .333 || .538 || 7.0 || 1.0 || 0.3 || 0.0 || 2.0 || 10.5
|-
| style="text-align:left;background:#afe6ba;"|2001†
| style="text-align:left;"|Los Angeles
| 5 || 0 || 5.4 || .333 || — || — || 1.4 || 0.6 || 0.0 || 0.0 || 0.4 || 1.2
|-
| style="text-align:left;"|Career
| style="text-align:left;"|4 years, 2 teams
| 12 || 7 || 20.8 || .486 || .250 || .700 || 4.7 || 1.0 || 0.2 || 0.1 || 1.2 || 7.3

Personal life
Mapp has a father named Kenneth. In 1998, she founded the nonprofit Follow Your Dreams Inc.

References

1969 births
Living people
American expatriate basketball people in France
American expatriate basketball people in Israel
American expatriate basketball people in Italy
American expatriate basketball people in South Korea
American expatriate basketball people in Spain
American expatriate basketball people in Turkey
Basketball players from North Carolina
Centers (basketball)
Charlotte Sting players
Los Angeles Sparks players
NC State Wolfpack women's basketball players
Sportspeople from Asheville, North Carolina